Polytypic means of more than one type. It often refers to:

 Polytypic function, in computer science
 Polytypic habitat, in ecology, a habitat not dominated by a single species
 Polytypic taxon, in biology, a taxon with more than one immediately subordinate taxa

See also
 Polyclonal antibodies
 Polytypes in crystallography
 Race (classification of human beings) for a discussion of whether the species Homo sapiens is polytypic